The Last of the Vikings (Italian:L'ultimo dei Vikinghi, French:Le Dernier des Vikings) is a 1961 French-Italian historical film directed by Giacomo Gentilomo and starring Cameron Mitchell, Edmund Purdom and Isabelle Corey. It was about Harald Sigurdsson. The film was allegedly co-directed by Mario Bava who was uncredited.

The film's sets were designed by the Italian art director Italo Tomassi.

Cast
 Cameron Mitchell as Harald  
 Edmund Purdom as King Sveno 
 Isabelle Corey as Hilde 
 Hélène Rémy as Edith / Elga  
 Andrea Aureli as Haakon  
 Mario Feliciani 
 Aldo Bufi Landi as Londborg  
 Carla Calò as Herta  
 Corrado Annicelli as Godrun  
 Nando Tamberlani as Gultred 
 Nando Angelini as Simon, uomo di Sveno  
 Piero Gerlini 
 George Ardisson as Guntar 
 Piero Lulli as Hardak, uomo di Sveno  
 Benito Stefanelli as Lorig, amico di Guntar

References

Bibliography 
 Derek Elley. The Epic Film: Myth and History. Routledge, 2013.

External links 
 

1961 films
Italian historical adventure films
French historical adventure films
1960s historical adventure films
Films directed by Giacomo Gentilomo
Films set in the Viking Age
1960s Italian-language films
1960s Italian films
1960s French films